Candy Matson was a radio program on NBC West Coast that aired from June 29, 1949, to May 20, 1951. It centered on Candy Matson, a female private investigator with a wry sense of humor and a penthouse on Telegraph Hill in San Francisco. The program was notable for having a striking female character "without a trace of squeamishness"  as well as a veiled gay character in Candy's best friend Rembrandt Watson, voiced by Jack Thomas. Candy's love interest was police detective Ray Mallard, voiced by Henry Leff. The announcer was Dudley Manlove. Actors frequently heard in minor roles were Helen Kleeb, John Grober, Mary Milford and Hal Burdick. In addition to the show being set in San Francisco, it was produced at San Francisco Radio City.

The series concluded with a twist ending when Ray finally proposed to Candy, who accepted and retired from the detective business.

It was created by Monty Masters and starred his wife Natalie Parks as Candy Matson. When Monty Masters created the show, he planned to star in it himself, as a male private detective. His mother-in-law convinced him to change the lead to a female, which led to his wife being the star.

In 1950, Candy Matson was recognized with the San Francisco Examiner'''s Favorite Program Award. The award was presented as part of the broadcast of the episode "Symphony of Death".

The aftermath of a 1950 episode illustrated the program's popularity. A newspaper story related: "It seems that during the closing moments of the last Monday's sequence, Candy is in an aircraft repeating the 'Twenty-third Psalm' as the plane crashes into a lake. At that point the show ends. And at that point the switchboard at Radio City started lighting up like a Christmas tree. More than 800 calls were received shortly after the program signed off. All of them wondering what happened to their heroine."

Only 14 of the 92 episodes survive, along with the April 1949 audition show, the September 1952 series revival audition show, and an episode written by Jack French for the BearManor book, It's That Time Again! Entitled "The Japanese Sandman", it was turned into a radio theater production by veteran radio theater producer Joe Bevilacqua, who also voiced all the roles including Candy herself, for the Blackstone Audio title The New Stories of Old-Time Radio Volume One''.

References

External links
 Candy Matson.com
 Internet Archive: Candy Matson episodes
 Jerry Haendiges Vintage Radio Logs 
 Candy Matson episodic log and more from The Digital Deli Too

American radio dramas
1940s American radio programs
NBC radio programs
1949 radio programme debuts
1951 radio programme endings
Detective radio shows